St. Maximillian Kolbe Catholic High School is a high school in Aurora, Ontario, Canada. The school opened in September 2009, and is administered by the York Catholic District School Board. St. Maximilian Kolbe CHS's patron saint is Saint Maximilian Kolbe, a Franciscan priest from Poland that was incarcerated and executed at the Auschwitz concentration camp as a political prisoner during World War II.

When the school opened in September 2009, there were less than 800 students in grades 9 and 10. In the 2010/2011 school year, St. Max had students in grades 9, 10, and 11. By the following school year, the school was teaching curriculum for grades 9 to 12 and graduated its first senior class in June 2012. The following June, St. Max graduated its first class of students that attended the institution from grades 9 to 12.

The school crest, logo, colour scheme, and mascot were chosen and during the 2008/2009 school year, before the school's completion.

The school currently offers French Immersion  and AP. Effective September 2023 it will also have a High Performance  Athlete (HPA) program.

See also 
List of high schools in Ontario

References

External links
St. Maximilian Kolbe Catholic High School

York Catholic District School Board
Education in Aurora, Ontario
High schools in the Regional Municipality of York
Educational institutions established in 2009
2009 establishments in Ontario